Ballingeary is a village in the Shehy Mountains in County Cork, Ireland.

The village is located within the Muskerry Gaeltacht (Irish-speaking area). According to the 2016 census, over 42% of the population speak Irish on a daily basis outside the education system. It has an active Irish-language summer school, Coláiste na Mumhan (College of Munster), which was attended by Thomas MacDonagh in the summer of 1906. It also hosts a yearly agricultural and horticultural show.

The River Lee rises a few kilometres west of the village, at Gougane Barra Park.

See also 
 List of towns and villages in Ireland

References

External links 
 Ballingeary.com

Towns and villages in County Cork
Gaeltacht places in County Cork
Gaeltacht towns and villages